Mahaletchumy Arujanan (born 25 May 1969) is a Malaysian scientist of Malaysian Indian origin. She works as the Global Coordinator of International Service for the Acquisition of Agribiotech Applications (ISAAA) and executive director of Malaysian Biotechnology Information Center (MABIC).

She has a bachelor's degree in biochemistry and microbiology from University Putra Malaysia, a Masters in Biotechnology and a Ph.D. in Science Communication from the University of Malaya. January 2003, she joined MABIC as a project officer and took over as the executive director in May 2005.

She is listed as one of the 100 most influential people in the field of biotechnology by the 7th edition of The Scientific American Worldwide View: A Global Biotechnology Perspective Journal. Arujanan founded  the country's first biotechnology newspaper, The Petri Dish. She is a recipient of 2010 TWAS Regional Prize for Public Understanding of Science for East, Southeast Asia, and Pacific Region, and has been listed as one of the prominent women in biotechnology law and regulations by Biotechnology Law Report. She was recognized as one of the Great Women of Our Time by the Malaysian Women's Weekly in their December 2015 issue.

Early life and education
Arujanan was born in Klang Valley, Malaysia to a Tamil school headmaster.

Mahaletchumy Arujanan started her primary and secondary education at Convent Klang and continued her pre-university (STPM) at ACS Klang. She pursued her bachelor's degree in University Putra Malaysia, majoring in Microbiology and Biochemistry and graduated in 1993. She continued her Masters in Biotechnology at University of Malaya and graduated in 1997.

Career

Arujanan started her career as a Technical and Admin Officer with Sandoz Agro Chemicals in 1992. Her stint at Sandoz did not last long as the company merged with Ciba Geigy and the regional office she was working was closed. She joined The International Plant Genetic Resources Institute, now known as Bioversity International as a Programme Officer. She left after 2 years to join the healthcare company DXN. Arujanan left DXN and joined Total Health Concept. 1999 to 2002, Arujanan was struggling to build a career and finally left Total Health Concept in 2002.

She joined the Malaysian Biotechnology Information Centre (MABIC) in January 2003 as a Project Officer and was promoted to be the Executive Director in May 2005. Arujanan revamped MABIC, made efforts to introduce the center to key ministries and government agencies, and forged a strong relationship with international partners. She started engaging with various stakeholders to create awareness on biotechnology. This led her to be a pioneer in science communication in Malaysia. She was appointed the Global Coordinator of ISAAA on 1 May 2019. She is now responsible for the entire network of ISAAA that has its presence in South East Asia, South Asia, East Asia, Africa, USA, and Latin America. Arujanan continued her Ph.D. in science communication in University of Malaya and completed in 2013.

Professional roles
Arujanan is appointed to a number of committees and advisory panels: 
 FAO's International Consultant on Strategy for Public Participation and Outreach for Sri Lanka
Farming Future Bangladesh, Advisory Board Member
Cornell Alliance for Science, Advisory Board Member
National Bioethics Council, Ministry of Science, Technology and Innovation
 Selangor Bio Council 
 Industry Advisory Board, school of Science, Monash University Malaysia 
 Industry Advisory Panel, Biotechnology Programme, Nilai International University 
 Industry Advisory Board, School of Biosciences, Taylor's University 
 Industry Advisory Board, Biotechnology Programme, Sunway University 
 Industry Advisory Panel, Faculty of Resource Science & Technology, Universiti Malaysia Sarawak 
 Industry Advisory Board, Quest International University Perak 
 Adjunct Lecturer, School of Science, Monash University Malaysia 
 Ad hoc Committee, Biosafety,  Ministry of Natural Resources and Environment, Malaysia 
 Trainer/Consultant, Malaysian Bioeconomy Corporation 
 Trainer, Industry Cluster of Excellence, Ministry of Higher Education Malaysia

The Petri Dish
Arujanan is the founding editor-in-chief for the first science newspaper in Malaysia, The Petri Dish. The newspaper was initiated to bring biotechnology to the public domain.

The newspaper started as a 12-page monthly in February 2011 with a circulation of 2,000 copies and has grown into a 20-page publication with 6,000 copies circulated to key stakeholders in the fields of science/biotechnology in Malaysia. With a strong belief that science should reach the public, Arujanan made efforts to circulate The Petri Dish to shopping malls, private hospitals, Starbucks outlets, and secondary schools. In Feb 2017, Arujanan was creating an online portal for The Petri Dish.

Contributions

Biotechnology communication
 Arujanan initiated several dialogues between scientists and ulama (Islamic scholars) to bridge the knowledge gap between the two groups. Despite being non-Muslim, she immensely contributed towards Muslim countries by creating awareness on agriculture biotechnology and food security. Her initiatives translate into the adoption of a resolution urging Muslim countries to adopt agriculture biotechnology. This is being used as a reference in Muslim countries.
 Arujanan introduced various non-traditional approaches to bring biotechnology to the public. One of it was through a fashion show. This was later adopted by her Kenyan counterpart. 
 Arujanan also introduced a carnival concept to create awareness on biotechnology to school students by engaging them with public speaking, debates, quiz, poster drawing and coloring competitions
 Arujanan was also very actively involved in advocating for a balanced biosafety regulation. She organized several conferences and seminars to create awareness among Malaysian and Asian scientists, policymakers, regulators and industry players on the need for a science-based biosafety regulation.
 Arujanan is a regular speaker around the world where she promotes agribiotechnology as a tool to ensure food security, alleviate poverty among farmers and sustainable development
Arujanan also founded the Asian Short Course on Agribiotechnology, Biosafety Regulations, and Communication (ASCA) in 2018 to create a capacity building platform for Asian policymakers and regulators in modern aAgribiotechnology, a multidisciplinary sector that involves international and national law, the science of modern biotechnology, socioeconomics, risk assessment, and management and communication. ASCA allows Asian stakeholders to upscale themselves in these areas without having to seek for training in the USA.

Society
Arujanan is an active speaker at schools and community events.

Roles and awards

References

Malaysian biologists
Malaysian people of Indian descent
Malaysian people of Tamil descent
Living people
People from Selangor
Tamil scientists
Tamil biochemists
1969 births